Ak-Bulak is a village in Batken Region of Kyrgyzstan. Administratively, it is part of the city of Kyzyl-Kyya. Its population was 6,497 in 2021.

Population

References

Populated places in Batken Region